Hanumappa Nagesh is an Indian politician and a member of the Karnataka Legislative Assembly representing the constituency of Mulbagal 

of Kolar district as an independent candidate. He was the minister for small scale industries from  the commerce department in the coalition government led by H. D. Kumaraswamy. Later he withdrew his support to the coalition government with its further downfall. He served as Minister For Excise department 
in B.S. Yediyurappa Cabinet from 20 August 2019. He also served as a Minister for Skill development, Entrepreneurship and Livelihood. On 14th January 2023, He joined the Congress party along with his supporters at the Karnataka Pradesh Congress Committee office in the presence of state president D K Shivakumar and legislature party leader Siddaramaiah.

References

Politics of Karnataka
Living people
1958 births
Indian politicians